T. D. J. Nagabhushanam (1928 - 2016) was an Agricultural Economist associated initially with the Andhra University in the 1950s followed by the Andhra Pradesh Agricultural University (APAU) since the 1960s in Bapatla and Hyderabad respectively.  Nagabhushanam first taught at the Agricultural College, Bapatla, which was then an affiliated entity of the Andhra University until it became a constituent College of the APAU in 1964.  After nearly three decades of teaching  in Bapatla, Nagabhushanam became the Principal during the 1980s after which he was made Dean of Agricultural economics and was notable for his research articles that were written over a period of nearly five decades beginning with the 1950s.

Education and Career
Nagabhushanam pursued studies in sciences specialising in Agriculture at the Andhra University during the 1950s where his postgraduate research was entitled A Study of the Economic and Social condition in Guntur District and joined the Agricultural College, Bapatla on 4 June 1951 as Assistant Lecturer in Agricultural Economics and rose on to become a Professor, Principal and finally Dean of Agricultural Economics at the Andhra Pradesh Agricultural University.  In addition to his teaching and administrative responsibilities at the University that included thesis supervision, Nagabhushanam had a flair for scientific research and contributed articles and was also a book reviewer in The Indian Journal of Agricultural Economics and delivered a guest lecture on Methodical Improvements in Agricultural Research in Economics at the University of Agricultural Sciences, Bangalore in 1981.

During the 1960s, Nagabhushanam was a Lieutenant in the National Cadet Corps.  He was also a member of the Indian Society of Agricultural Economics and was also elected to its Executive Committee in the year 1979.

Articles published

Honorary initiatives
As a reader of the Telugu Bible, Nagabhushanam was also involved in the work of the Bible Societies and was a fund-raiser and member of the Bible Society of India Andhra Pradesh Auxiliary and subsequently in the 1990s, during the tenures of the Auxiliary Secretaries led by the Baptist Priest Lella Prakasam, CBCNC followed by the Old Testament Scholar, G. Babu Rao, CBCNC, he was elevated to the position of a Committee Member and Vice-President of the Auxiliary which was then housed at the Bible House in Secunderabad.

See also
 Prof. Dr. M. Abel, Ph. D. (California),
 Prof. Dr. P. A. James, Ph. D. (Osmania),
 Dr. J. A. Oliver, Ph. D. (ANGRAU),
 Prof. Dr. B. E. Vijayam, Ph. D. (Osmania),
 Prof. Dr. P. Judson, Ph. D. (Osmania)

References

2016 deaths
Telugu people
Indian Baptists
20th-century Indian economists
Indian agriculturalists
Andhra Pradesh academics
1928 births
Indian Council of Agricultural Research
Scientists from Hyderabad, India
Indian farmers
Indian Christians
20th-century Baptists
People from Guntur district